Little Buddha is a 1993 drama film directed by Bernardo Bertolucci, written by Rudy Wurlitzer and Mark Peploe, and produced by usual Bertolucci collaborator Jeremy Thomas. An international co-production of Italy, France, and the United Kingdom, the film stars Chris Isaak, Bridget Fonda and Keanu Reeves as Prince Siddhartha (the Buddha before his enlightenment).

Plot
Tibetan Buddhist monks from a monastery in Bhutan, (Rinpung Dzong), led by Lama Norbu, are searching for a child who is the rebirth of a great Buddhist teacher, Lama Dorje. Lama Norbu and his fellow monks believe they have found a candidate for the child in whom Lama Dorje is reborn: an American boy named Jesse Conrad, the young son of an architect and a teacher who live in Seattle. The monks come to Seattle in order to meet the boy.

Jesse is fascinated with the monks and their way of life, but his parents, Dean and Lisa, are wary, and that wariness turns into near-hostility when Norbu announces that he wants to take Jesse back with him to Bhutan to be tested. Dean changes his mind, however, when one of his close friends and colleagues commits suicide because he went broke. Dean then decides to travel to Bhutan with Jesse. In Nepal, two children who are also candidates for the rebirth are encountered, Raju and Gita.

Gradually, over the course of the movie, first Jesse's mother and then Lama Norbu tell the life story of Prince Siddhartha, reading from a book that Lama Norbu has given to Jesse.

In ancient Nepal (Lumbini), a prince called Siddhartha turns his back on his comfortable and protected life, and sets out on a journey to solve the problem of universal suffering. As he progresses, he learns profound truths about the nature of life, consciousness, and reality. Ultimately, he battles Mara (a demon representing the ego), who repeatedly tries to divert and destroy Siddhartha. Through the final complete realization of the illusory nature of his own ego, Siddhartha attains enlightenment and becomes the Buddha.

In the final scenes of the movie, it is found that all three children are rebirths of Lama Dorje, separate manifestations of his body (Raju), speech (Gita), and mind (Jesse). A ceremony is held and Jesse's father also learns some of the essential truths of Buddhism. His work finished, Lama Norbu enters a deep state of meditation and dies. As the funeral ceremony begins, Lama Norbu speaks to the children, seemingly from a higher plane, telling them to have compassion; and just before the credits roll the children are seen distributing his ashes.

At the very end of the film credits, the sand mandala that was seen being constructed during the movie is destroyed, "with one swift stroke."

Cast

 Bridget Fonda as Lisa Conrad
 Keanu Reeves as Siddhartha
 Chris Isaak as Dean Conrad
 Ying Ruocheng as Lama Norbu
 Alex Wiesendanger as Jesse Conrad
 Raju Lal as Raju
 Greishma Makar Singh as Gita
 Sogyal Rinpoche as Kenpo Tenzin
 Ven. Khyongla Rato Rinpoche as Abbot
 Ven. Geshe Gyeltsen as Lama Dorje
 Jo Champa as Maria
 Jigme Kunsang as Champa
 Thubtem Jampa as Punzo
 Surekha Sikri as Sonali (as Surehka Sikri)
 T.K. Lama as Sangay
 Doma as Ani la
 Santosh Bangera as Channa (charioteer of prince Siddhartha)

Production

Casting
Three Tibetan incarnate high lamas, also known as tulkus or rinpoche, have roles in the film. "I wanted the real thing," said Mr. Bertolucci. The Venerable Khyongla Rato Rinpoche plays the part of the Abbot of the monastery in Bhutan.  Dzongsar Jamyang Khyentse Rinpoche appears near the end of the film, when Lama Norbu is shown meditating overnight, and as a consultant, supervised every gesture and ritual performed by Tibetan monks.  Sogyal Rinpoche appears in the earlier segments in the role of Khenpo Tenzin. In a later documentary about Khyentse Rinpoche entitled Words of my Perfect Teacher, his role in the film is discussed along with a short interview with Bertolucci.

Filming
The Buddha flashback scenes of Little Buddha were photographed in 65 mm Todd-AO by cinematographer Vittorio Storaro. The rest of the film was filmed in 35 mm anamorphic Technovision.

Jeremy Thomas later remembered making the film:

Thomas formed a bond with the Bhutanese Tibetan Buddhist Lama Dzongsar Jamyang Khyentse Rinpoche who was an advisor on the film, and went on to help him make several other films such as The Cup (1999) and Travelers and Magicians (2003).

In addition to Kathmandu, another prominent Nepalese location used in the film was the city of Bhaktapur.

Soundtrack

The soundtrack for the film was entirely composed by Japanese pianist/composer Ryuichi Sakamoto.

Track listing

 "Main Theme" 2:50
 "Opening Titles" 1:47
 "The First Meeting" 1:50
 "Raga Kirvani" 1:28
 "Nepalese Caravan" 3:01
 "Victory" 1:45
 "Faraway Song" 3:18
 "Red Dust" 4:38
 "River Ashes" 2:25
 "Exodus" 2:33
 "Evan's Funeral" 4:28
 "The Middle Way" 1:50
 "Raga Naiki Kanhra / The Trial" 5:25
 "Enlightenment" 4:28
 "The Reincarnation" 1:52
 "Gompa - Heart Sutra"	2:38
 "Acceptance - End Credits" 8:57

Release
The film had its world premiere in France on 1 December 1993, opening on 187 screens.

Reception

Critical reception
The film received mixed to positive reviews, as it currently holds a 65% rating on Rotten Tomatoes based on 26 reviews. The consensus summarizes: "Little Buddhas storytelling may be too childlike to best service its audacious plot, but Bernardo Bertolucci's direction and Vittorio Storaro's cinematography conspire to deliver a visually strong epic."

Roger Ebert gave the film only two stars, and called it "a slow-moving and pointless exercise by Bertolucci, whose 'The Last Emperor' was a much superior telling of a similar story about a child who is chosen for great things."

Desson Howe of The Washington Post called the film "beguiling [and] unpretentious", adding that "Bertolucci intermixes high art with childlike wonder, blatant special effects with tacit spirituality."

Wrote Janet Maslin in The New York Times:

Box office
The film was very successful in France, where it was the 19th highest-grossing film of the year, with 1,359,483 admissions. In its opening week in France, it sold 308,660 tickets for a gross of $1.52 million. The film, against competition from such films as The Flintstones and Maverick, opened at number 9 at the US box office. It dropped out of the top ten the next week, closing on June 16, 1994 at number 13, with a total of $4.8 million. It grossed $48 million worldwide against its $30 million budget.

Awards and nominations
The film was nominated for one Razzie Award, Worst New Star for Chris Isaak.

Year-end lists 
 10th – Desson Howe, The Washington Post
 Top 10 runner-ups (not ranked) – Janet Maslin, The New York Times
 Honorable mention – Betsy Pickle, Knoxville News-Sentinel
 Honorable mention – Dan Craft, The Pantagraph

See also
Depictions of Gautama Buddha in film

References

External links
 
 
 

1994 films
Films directed by Bernardo Bertolucci
Films about Buddhism
Films about Gautama Buddha
Metaphysical fiction films
English-language Italian films
English-language French films
Tibetan Buddhist art and culture
Films set in Seattle
Films set in Bhutan
Films set in India
Films set in Nepal
Films shot in Nepal
1994 drama films
Ryuichi Sakamoto albums
American drama films
Fictional Buddhist monks
Films shot in Washington (state)
Films produced by Jeremy Thomas
Films scored by Ryuichi Sakamoto
Albums produced by Ryuichi Sakamoto
1990s English-language films
1990s American films